Moody Nunatak is a prominent isolated nunatak at the east side of Marsh Glacier,  west of Bartrum Plateau, in the Queen Elizabeth Range of Antarctica. It was named by the New Zealand Geological Survey Antarctic Expedition of 1964–65 for Lieutenant D.M. Moody, a pilot with U.S. Navy Squadron VX-6, who flew the southern party of the expedition in and out of the field.

References

Nunataks of Oates Land